Tokheho Yepthomi (born 1 April 1956) is an Indian politician from Nagaland. He is a former Cabinet Minister of Nagaland and currently Member of Parliament, Lok Sabha for Nagaland.

Early life and personal life

Tokheho Yepthomi was born and raised in Aghunato, Nagaland. He graduated from St. Edmund's College, Shillong and was an active student leader in his college days. He served as the President of Eastern Sumi Students Union before entering active politics as a member of the Indian National youth Congress. Prior to seeking election he was involved in the timber trade during the peak timber business period of Nagaland in the 1980s.

Political career

Tokheho Yepthomi has been elected to the Nagaland Legislative Assembly for 5 terms from 1993 to 2018. He has served as a cabinet minister for Transport and Communication, Public Health Engineering Department and Public Works Department from 1995 to 2008 under former Chief Ministers S C Jamir and Neiphiu Rio. 

He served as the Congress Legislature Party Leader and Leader of Opposition in the state assembly from 2010 to 2015.. While in opposition, he led a campaign for the dismissal of the then state Education Minister, Nyeiwang Konyak who was allegedly involved in financial irregularities of INR 5,000,000 in the department. He appealed to then Nagaland state governor Nikhil Kumar to accord sanction for prosecution under the Prevention of Corruption Act. 

As T. R. Zeliang reshuffled and expanded his cabinet, Yepthomi joined was sworn as a cabinet minister while still being part of the Indian National Congress to form a government with no opposition in the state legislature. He was allotted the portfolio of Public Health Engineering, School Education and Parliament Affairs in May 2015.

After joining the newly formed Nationalist Democratic Progressive Party (NDPP), Yepthomi was selected as the consensus candidate for the People's Democratic Alliance (PDA) to contest by-election to the lone Lok Sabha seat from Nagaland in 2018. The seat was vacated by Neiphiu Rio to become the Chief Minister of Nagaland. He was again selected as the consensus candidate for the PDA in the 2019 General Elections. In the closest election in recent history, Yepthomi won a second term in Lok Sabha by a margin of around 16344 votes.

References

http://www.kuknalim.com/modules.php?name=News&file=article&sid=5126
http://www.ptinews.com/news/468101_Nagaland-Congress-gets-new-president--CLP-leader
http://www.thestatesman.com/news/opinion/-team-nagaland/63898.html
https://www.news18.com/news/politics/nagaland-election-results-2019-live-updates-winner-loser-leading-trailing-2155035.html

1956 births
Indian National Congress politicians from Nagaland
Living people
People from Zünheboto district
Nagaland MLAs 2013–2018
Leaders of the Opposition of Nagaland
Nagaland MLAs 1993–1998
Nagaland MLAs 1998–2003
Nagaland MLAs 2003–2008
India MPs 2019–present
Nationalist Democratic Progressive Party politicians